Take Apart The Words is the debut EP by Philadelphia emo/indie rock band Breaking Pangaea. It was released in 2000 on Undecided Records. "Lullaby" was later re-recorded and rearranged for Mascherino's later band, Terrible Things.

Track listing
The Last - 3:32
Colors On The Inside - 3:51
Under The Talking - 4:32
The Truth - 3:17
Lullaby - 5:00

Credits
Fred Mascherino - Guitar, Vocals
Clint Stelfox - Bass 
Will Noon - Drums

2000 debut EPs
Albums with cover art by Jacob Bannon
Undecided Records EPs